The Call is an album by American jazz pianist Mal Waldron recorded in 1971 and released on the JAPO label. The album was the first release on the short-lived European jazz label. It is Waldron's only album as a bandleader to feature him playing the electric piano.

Reception
AllMusic awarded the album 3 stars. It was included as one of the 640 albums covered in the 2013 Japanese book Obscure Sound, written by Chee Shimizu. Shimizu praised the album for its "funky psychedelic groove" and interplay between Waldron's electric piano and Jimmy Jackson's organ.

Track listing
All compositions by Mal Waldron
 "The Call" — 18:53 
 "Thoughts" — 21:50 
Recorded at Tonstudio Bauer in Ludwigsburg, West Germany on February 1, 1971.

Personnel
 Mal Waldron — electric piano 
 Jimmy Jackson — organ 
 Eberhard Weber — electric bass
 Fred Braceful — drums, percussion

References

JAPO Records albums
Mal Waldron albums
1971 albums
Albums produced by Manfred Eicher